The Battle of An Lộc was a major battle of the Vietnam War that lasted for 66 days and culminated in a tactical victory for South Vietnam. The struggle for An Lộc in 1972 was an important battle of the war, as South Vietnamese forces halted the North Vietnamese advance towards Saigon.

Background
An Lộc is the capital of Bình Phước Province located northwest of Military Region III. During North Vietnam's Easter Offensive (known in Vietnam as the Nguyen Hue Offensive) of 1972, An Lộc was at the centre of People's Army of Vietnam (PAVN) strategy, its location on Route QL-13 near Base Area 708 in Cambodia allowed safeguarding supplies based out of a "neutral" location in order to reduce exposure to U.S. bombing. To protect this critical area, the Army of the Republic of Vietnam (ARVN) had essentially a single division in Bình Phước Province, the 5th Division. During the battle, the 5th Division was outnumbered by a combined force consisting of three PAVN and Viet Cong divisions. This fighting which ensued became the most protracted conflict of the 1972 Easter Offensive.

This prevented resupply of ARVN forces in An Lộc battle.

Battle
On the evening of 7 April, elements of the PAVN 9th Division overran Quần Lợi Base Camp. Its defenders, the 7th Regiment of the 5th Division, were ordered to destroy their heavy equipment (including a combined 105mm and 155mm artillery battery) and fall back to An Lộc. Once captured, the PAVN used Quần Lợi as a staging base for units coming in from Cambodia to join the siege of An Lộc. Key members of COSVN were based there to oversee the battle.

On 7 April the 21st Division was alerted for movement from IV Corps to III Corps. On 10 April the first elements of this division were already deployed to Lai Khê.

On 8 April, the small town of Lộc Ninh was overrun and about half of the defenders escaped to An Lộc.

The ARVN defenders of An Lộc were made up of several units of the 5th Division, including the Division's 8th Regiment with about 2,100 men; the 7th Regiment which was short one battalion and only had 850 men; the 9th Regiment, most of which was destroyed at Lộc Ninh, had only had 200 men; Task Force 52, 500 men; the 3rd Ranger Group, 1,300 men; as well as Binh Long Provincial Regional Force, Popular Forces and People's Self-Defense Forces (PSDF), about 2,000 men. The defenders were later reinforced by the elite 81st Ranger Group and the 1st Airborne Brigade, brought in by air because QL-13 was blocked by the PAVN. Because the ARVN defense had little artillery, it was heavily reliant on U.S. air support. Other reinforcements consisted of the 21st Division, which was plagued by a very slow move from the Delta area in the south of the country and cleared QL-13 after protracted fighting.

The ARVN defenders did have one card to play throughout the battle: the immense power of U.S. air support. The use of United States Air Force (USAF) B-52 Stratofortress bombers (capable of carrying 108 MK82s (500 pound) bombs on one run) in a close support tactical role, as well as AC-119 Stinger and AC-130E Spectre gunships, fixed wing cargo aircraft of varying sizes, AH-1 Cobra attack helicopters and Republic of Vietnam Air Force (RVNAF) A-37s. These methods worked to blunt the PAVN offensive. At this stage in the war, the PAVN often attacked with PT-76 amphibious and T-54 medium tanks spearheading the advance, usually preceded by a massive artillery barrage. These tactics reflected Soviet doctrine, as the PAVN had been supplied with Soviet and Chinese Communist equipment, including jets, artillery, and surface-to-air missiles since the beginning of the war. The battle eventually stagnated and became a periodic trade of artillery barrages. This was most probably a result of casualties sustained in the frustrated attacks on heavily entrenched enemy positions in control of a withering array of supporting firepower.

On 12 April a relief force of the 32nd Regiment, 21st Division departed Lai Khê to reopen QL-13 to Chơn Thành Camp, 30 km south of An Lộc.

The first attack on the city occurred on 13 April and was preceded by a powerful artillery barrage. The PAVN captured several hills to the north and penetrated the northern portion of the city held by the 8th Regiment and 3rd Ranger Group. ARVN soldiers were not accustomed to dealing with tanks, but early success with the M72 LAW, including efforts by teenaged members of the PSDF, went a long way to helping the overall effort. The 5th Division commander, General Hung, later ordered tank-destroying teams be formed by each battalion, which included PSDF members who knew the local terrain and could help identify strategic locations to ambush tanks. They took advantage of the fact that the PAVN forces, who were not used to working with tanks, often let the tanks get separated from their infantry by driving through ARVN defensive positions. At that point, all alone inside ARVN lines, they were vulnerable to being singled out by tank-destroying teams.

15 April saw the second attack on the city. The PAVN were concerned that because the ARVN 1st Airborne Brigade had air-assaulted into positions west of the city, that they were now coming to reinforce the defenders. Again the PAVN preceded their attack with an artillery barrage followed by a tank-infantry attack. Like before, their tanks became separated from their infantry and fell prey to ARVN anti-tank weapons. PAVN infantry followed behind the tank deployment, assaulted the ARVN defensive positions, and pushed farther into the city. B-52 strikes helped break up some PAVN units assembling for the attack. This engagement lasted until tapering off on the afternoon of April 16.

Unable to take the city, the PAVN kept it under constant artillery fire. They also moved in more anti-aircraft guns to prevent aerial resupply. Heavy anti-aircraft fire kept RVNAF helicopters from getting into the city after 12 April. In response, fixed wing RVNAF aircraft (C-123s and C-119s) made attempts, but after suffering losses, the USAF took over on 19 April. The USAF used C-130s to parachute in supplies, but many missed the defenders and several aircraft were shot down or damaged. Low altitude drops during day and night did not do the job, so by 2 May, the USAF began using High Altitude Low Opening (HALO) techniques. With far greater success, this method of resupply was utilized until 25 June, when the siege was lifted and aircraft could land at An Lộc.

After making slow progress, on 22 April the 32nd Regiment encountered a roadblock of the PAVN 101st Regiment 15 km north of Lai Khê. From 24 April the division engaged the PAVN in a two-pronged attack to clear the road with the 32nd Regiment attacking from the north and the 33rd Regiment attacking from the south. These attacks eventually forced the 101st Regiment to withdraw west on 27 April, leaving one battalion to cover the withdrawal for a further two days. The 31st Regiment was then lifted by helicopters to 6 km north of Chơn Thành where it fought the PAVN 165th Regiment, 7th Division, later reinforced by the 209th Regiment, for the next 13 days.

On 11 May the PAVN launched a massive all-out infantry and armor (T-54 medium tanks) assault on An Lộc. The attack was carried out by units of the 5th and 9th PAVN divisions. This attack was repulsed by a combination of U.S. airpower and the determined stand of ARVN soldiers on the ground. Almost every B-52 in Southeast Asia was called in to strike the massing enemy tanks and infantry. The commander of the defending forces had placed a grid around the town creating many "boxes", each measuring 1 km by 3 km in size, which were given a number and could be called by ground forces at any time. The B-52 cells (groups of three aircraft) were guided onto these boxes by ground-based radar. During 11 and 12 May, the USAF managed a B-52 mission every 55 minutes for 30 hours straight—using 170 B-52s and smashing whole regiments of PAVN in the process. Despite this air support, the PAVN made gains, and were within a few hundred meters of the ARVN 5th Division command post. ARVN counter-attacks were able to stabilize the situation. By the night of 11 May, the PAVN consolidated their gains. During that day an A-37B piloted by First lieutenant Michael Blassie was shot down while providing air support, his body was recovered in late 1972 and he was separated from the identification documents recovered leading to him being later designated as the unknown service member from the Vietnam War buried at the Tomb of the Unknown Soldier at Arlington National Cemetery. 

On 12 May the PAVN launched new attacks in an effort to take the city, but again failed. The PAVN launched one more attack on 19 May in honor of Ho Chi Minh's birthday. The defenders were not surprised, and the attack was broken up by U.S. air support and an ambush by the ARVN paratroopers.

On 13 May with intensive air support the 31st Regiment finally overran the PAVN positions and extended ARVN control to 8 km north of Chơn Thành. The 32nd Regiment then deployed into the Tau O area a further 5 km north, where they ran into the 209th Regiment's well-prepared blocking positions, which stopped the division's advance for 38 days despite extensive artillery and air support, including B-52 strikes. This stalemate would continue until the PAVN withdrew from An Lộc. On 15 May a task force of the 15th Regiment, 9th Division, which was redeployed from the Mekong Delta, and the 9th Armored Cavalry Squadron, 21st Division moved north, east of QL-13 bypassing the Tau O roadblock to establish a fire support base at Tan Khai 10 km south of An Lộc. On 20 May the PAVN 141st Regiment attacked the base at Tan Khai and continued attacking unsuccessfully for three days against a determined defense before withdrawing. In mid-July the 21st Division was replaced by the 25th Division and it completed the destruction of the remaining PAVN strongpoints at Tau O by 20 July.

On 13/14 June a regiment of the 18th Division was landed in An Lộc to reinforce the exhausted 5th Division. On 17 June the 48th Regiment, 5th Division reoccupied Hill 169, allowing them to guide air and artillery strikes on PAVN forces. By 18 June 1972, the III Corps commander declared the battle was over. Despite this declaration, An Lộc remained under PAVN artillery fire, on 9 July Third [Military] Regional Assistance Command (TRAC) deputy commander Brigadier General Richard J. Tallman and his aides had just landed at An Lộc when they were hit by PAVN artillery fire, three of the group were killed instantly, while Tallman and two others were wounded. The wounded men were evacuated to the 3rd Field Hospital in Saigon where Tallman died of his wounds. He was the last U.S. Army general to die in South Vietnam.

Aftermath
The victory, however, was not complete. QL-13 still was not open. On 11 July the entire 18th Division arrived at An Lộc to replace the 5th Division. The 18th Division would spread out from An Lộc and push the PAVN back, increasing control in the area.

On 8 August the 18th Division launched an assault to retake Quần Lợi, but was stopped by the PAVN in the base's reinforced concrete bunkers. A second attack was launched on 9 August with limited gains. Attacks on the base continued for two weeks; eventually one third of the base was captured. Finally, the ARVN attacked the PAVN-occupied bunkers with TOW missiles and M-202 rockets, breaking the PAVN defense and forcing the remaining defenders to flee the base.

The fighting at An Lộc demonstrated the continued ARVN dependence on U.S. air power and U.S. advisors. For the PAVN, it demonstrated their logistical constraints; following each attack, resupply times caused lengthy delays in their ability to properly defend their position.

References

Further reading

External links
 Battle of An Loc – by Lieutenant Colonel James H. Willbanks
 The Battle of An Loc – A Massive Convergence of Forces

Conflicts in 1972
1972 in Vietnam
Battles and operations of the Vietnam War
Battles involving the United States
History of Bình Phước Province
Battles involving Vietnam
Battles and operations of the Vietnam War in 1972
April 1972 events in Asia
May 1972 events in Asia
June 1972 events in Asia
July 1972 events in Asia